St George William Lane Fox-Pitt (born 14 September 1856 in Malta, died 6 April 1932 in South Eaton Place) was a British electrical engineer and student of psychic phenomena.

Life
His parents were Lieutenant General Augustus Henry Lane-Fox (1827–1900) and Alice Margaret (1828–1910, née Stanley). His younger sister was the essayist Agnes Geraldine Grove. On the death of his father's cousin Horace Pitt-Rivers, 6th Baron Rivers, the family took the name Fox Pitt-Rivers on 25 May 1880.

In 1878, Fox-Pitt was granted a patent on a light bulb with a platinum-iridium filament. The patent also describes a system for power distribution using incandescent lamps in parallel.

On 12 December 1879, Charles Francis Brush founded the Anglo-American Electric Light Company Ltd in the UK, and in the same year acquired the patent rights to produce the Lane-Fox incandescent lamp. On 24 March 1880, he founded a new company, Anglo-American Brush Electric Light Corporation, which took over the previous one.

About 1880, Fox-Pitt is said to have successfully experimented with charred plant fibres as the filament material. That was about the same time as the development of the light bulb with carbon filament by Edison in the United States. By 1883, Fox-Pitt had obtained further patents.

Fox-Pitt wrote books on the philosophy of science, education, and social problems. He was temporarily Vice-President of the Moral Education League and organized the International Moral Education Congress. He was also one of the first active members of the Society for Psychical Research.

In 1891, he repurchased the patent rights of the Anglo-American Brush Electric Light Corporation and built himself a small lamp factory.

In 1898, he participated in a railway concession in Ecuador.

In 1899, he married Lady Edith Gertrude Douglas (1874–1963), the daughter of John Sholto Douglas, 9th Marquess of Queensberry.

Works 
 The Purpose of Education, 1914, Cambridge University Press,
 Free Will & Destiny, 1920, Constable Books, London

References

External links 
 St George Lane Fox-Pitt, Biography

British electrical engineers
1856 births
1932 deaths
British inventors